Lino Capolicchio (21 August 1943 – 3 May 2022) was an Italian actor, screenwriter, and director. He won a special David di Donatello acting award for his role in Vittorio de Sica's 1970 film, The Garden of the Finzi-Contini.

Capolicchio was a well-known television actor before breaking into film with an uncredited role in Franco Zeffirelli's The Taming of the Shrew in 1967. He appeared in over seventy films and television dramas. In 1995 he wrote and directed Pugili, an award-winning film about the world of boxing.

For three seasons, Capolicchio provided the voice for Bo Duke in the Italian broadcasts of The Dukes of Hazzard.

Partial filmography
 
1967: The Taming of the Shrew - Gregory (uncredited)
1968: Escalation - Luca Lambertinghi
1969: Metti una sera a cena - Rick / Nina's lover
1969: Il giovane normale - Giordano
1969: Vergogna schifosi - Carletto
1970: The Garden of the Finzi-Continis - Giorgio
1970: Le tue mani sul mio corpo - Andrea
1971: Mio padre Monsignore - Carlo Alberto Maggiolino
1971: Un apprezzato professionista di sicuro avvenire - Vincenzo Arduni
1972: For Love One Dies - Renato
1972: Body of Love - The Young Stranger
1973: Amore e ginnastica - Simone Censani
1974: Last Days of Mussolini - Pierluigi Bellini delle Stelle 'Pedro'
1974: Di mamma non ce n'è una sola - Marcello
1975: The Last Day of School Before Christmas - Erasmo
1976: Càlamo - Riccardo
1976: Cross Shot - Antonio Blasi
1976: The House with Laughing Windows - Stefano
1978: The Bloodstained Shadow - Stefano D'Archangelo
1979: Le strelle nel fosso - Silvano
1980: Lion of the Desert - Captain Bedendo
1980: Il mondo degli ultimi
1982: Canto d'amore - Giulio
1984: The Three of Us - Leopoldo Mozart
1988: The Last Minute - Renzo De Carlo
1992: Fratelli e sorelle - Aldo
1992: Il giardino dei ciliegi - Pietro
1993: Fiorile - Luigi
1995: Pugili (writer & director)
1996: Traveling Companion - Pepe
1997: Porzus - Galvano
1999: Il tempo dell'amore - Doctor
2001: L'accertamento - Giacomo Toschi
2001: An Impossible Crime - Valerio Garau
2002: Il diario di Matilde Manzoni (writer & director)
2004: L'eretico - Un gesto di coraggio - Cino da Pistoia
2009: Aller-retour - Giuseppe Amato
2010: A Second Childhood - Emilio
2014: L'altro Adamo
2014: Fuori Mira - Carlo Buzzi
2018: Respiri - Michele

References

External links
 
 Lino Capolicchio at Allmovie
 Lino Capolicchio at Fandango

1943 births
2022 deaths
Italian male actors
Italian film directors
Italian screenwriters
People from Merano
Accademia Nazionale di Arte Drammatica Silvio D'Amico alumni
David di Donatello winners
Italian male screenwriters